Abau Airport  is an airport in Abau, Papua New Guinea.

References

Airports in Papua New Guinea